Kristo Dako (1880–1941), son of Anastas Dako, was an Albanian patriot and publisher of the early 20th century.

Early Years and Education 
Kristo Dako was born in Korçë, in the Manastir Vilayet of the Ottoman Empire in 1880. He migrated to Bucharest, where he finished high school and later the Faculty of Mathematics. Dako was also a student of literature at Bucharest University.
 Though he had studied mathematics, Dako's passion was in ancient history. He was the strong supporter of the thesis that Albanians are descendants of the ancient Illyrians, Epirotes, and Macedonians, one of the pillars of Albanian Nationalism.

From 1906 to 1913, Dako studied theology at Oberlin Theological Seminary, graduating with a Bachelor of Divinity.

Biography 
While in Bucharest Dako along with Aleksandër Stavre Drenova founded Qarku i studentëvet shqiptarë (Circle of Albanian students) in 1899 and by March 1902 had become the Shpresa (Hope) Society consisting of young nationalists that aimed to enlighten Albanians on the national question. Dako represented Shpresa at the Congress of the Subjugated People of Turkey held in Vienna, 1902 and presented proposals relating to the creation of Albanian schools, Albanian language liturgy being conducted in Orthodox churches, and release of all political prisoners.

Dako was the husband of Sevasti Qiriazi, Albanian patriot and pioneer of female education in Albania, from the well known Qiriazi family of Monastir. The couple met in Bucharest, and moved to the US in 1907. Dako pursued there a degree in philosophy. He is remembered for initiating and opening the first Albanian school in US in 1908, located in Natick, MA. Petro Nini Luarasi taught there between others.

Dako returned shortly in Albania in June 1911, right in the middle of the Albanian Revolt of 1911, together with Charles Richard Crane of Chicago. There he would be imprisoned for a short time due to his nationalistic activities. He was released afternoon with Crane's intervention, and his persecutor Şevket Turgut Pasha immediately removed from the Ottoman authorities. Charles Crane would become one of the few lobbyists of Albania at that time, allegedly managing to influence the American government on lobbying for Albania towards the British during the London Conference of 1912–13.

An editor of the Dielli magazine and chairman of Vatra, the Pan-Albanian Federation of America in 1913. In 1914, he shortly visited his home town in Albania. Due to later divergences with Fan Noli, he partly retired from Vatra. In 1918 he would join the "Albanian Political Party" (Albanian: Partia Politike Shqiptare). In 1916, he published the short-lived (8 issues) newspaper Bilioteka Zeri i Shqiperise ("Voice of Albania Library") in Southbrigde, MA. Dako later participated in the Paris Peace Conference, 1919. He met twice with then United States president Woodrow Wilson, and explained to him the Albanian national aspirations.

Dako also became minister of education in one of Ahmet Zogu's cabinets. Apparently Zogu showed respect for Dako, and shortly met him in the eve of the Italian Invasion of 1939, asking for US support through Dako's connections. Because of this affiliation, Dako's name would be thrown in darkness during the communist regime of post WWII. His family would be persecuted (including his sister in law Parashqevi) and two sons would be arrested and imprisoned.

Probably the most important achievement of Dako is the founding of the Higher Institute of Girls "Qiriazi",  in Korçë and later in Kamëz, Tiranë.

Published Works
The following works are known to have been written by Kristo Dako:

Cilet jane Shqipëtarët? ("Who are the Albanians?"), Monastir, 1911.
Albania's Rights and Claims to Independence and Territorial Integrity (memorandum sent to President Woodrow Wilson), July 20, 1918.
The Strength of the National Consciousness of the Albanian People, August 1918.
Albania, the Master Key to the Near East (Boston: E.L. Grimes, 1919). (Republished 2020, IAPS).  
"Albania and its Unredeemed Territories" (map) (Boston: E.L. Grimes, 1919).
Liga e Prizrenit ("The League of Prizren"), Bucharest, 1922.
Shenime historike nga jeta dhe vepra e Nalt Madherise se tij Zogu i Pare, Mbret i Shqiptarevet, Tirana: Shtëpija Botonjëse "Kristo Luarasi", 1937.

See also
Sevasti Qiriazi
Parashqevi Qiriazi
Albanian National Awakening
Paris Peace Conference, 1919
Albanians of Romania

Notes and references
Notes:

References

1876 births
1941 deaths
People from Korçë
People from Manastir vilayet
Albanians from the Ottoman Empire
Albanian Protestants
Activists of the Albanian National Awakening
Albanian educators
Government ministers of Albania
Education ministers of Albania